The operations and infrastructure of Kuala Lumpur International Airport reflect its design.

Facilities

Design
The concept of KLIA's terminal building area was prepared by the late Japanese architect Kisho Kurokawa.  The terminal building area was designed using the concept of Airport in the forest, forest in the airport, in which it is surrounded by green space. This was done with the co-operation of the Forest Research Institute of Malaysia. An entire section of rain forest was transplanted from the jungle and put in the satellite building.

The airport is designed to handle up to 100 million passengers per year. It has colour-coded signage in Malay, English, Chinese, Japanese and Arabic and an automated people mover and travelators to allow easy movement in the airport.

The runways and buildings cover an area of 100 square kilometres. With its 75 ramp stands, it is capable of handling 120 aircraft movements at a time. There are 216 check-in counters, arranged in six check-in aisles. The airport is the first in the world to use the Total Airport Management Systems (TAMS).

Air traffic control tower

There are two air traffic control towers at Kuala Lumpur International Airport: the main control tower and apron control tower. Tower West is 133.8 metres tall and is the tallest air traffic control tower in the world, followed by Suvarnabhumi Airport's control tower and KLIA's Terminal West. Shaped like an Olympic torch, it houses the air traffic control systems and radar equipment.

The 55  metre apron control tower is responsible for the provision of Air Traffic Service to aircraft and vehicles movement in the northern and southern parts of the Satellite Terminal building and the cargo apron areas.

Runways
Each runway also has 10 taxiways exit with the taxi time ranging from 2 minutes to 11 minutes. The two full-service runways can handle 120 movements per hour when one runway handles taking off and one runway handles landing. Each runway is also equipped with one completely parallel taxiway with a second parallel taxiway. The runways at KLIA are able to accommodate the Airbus A380. Future expansion of the KLIA Master Plan includes the addition of another two runways. The new KLIA2 expansion which was completed in May 2014 was followed by the opening of the new runway 15/33, before which the airport had only two runways.

Baggage handling system

The airport's baggage handling system (BHS) features baggage common check-in at any of the 216 counters on a 24-hour basis and incorporates automatic bar-code sorting control, 4 level in-line baggage security screening and high speed conveyor belts.

The BHS was built by Toyo Kanetsu and in 2006 a contract to extend the system from the satellite building to the ERL (Express Rail Link) platform in the Main Terminal Building was awarded to Siemens. The new system from Siemens will transport baggage between the two terminals at speeds of up to 36 km per hour, compared to the previous rate of 7.2 km per hour. The new system uses a high-speed tray conveyor system in which bags are placed on individual trays for better control and tracking at high speed compared to conventional belt conveyors enables the baggage to be checked-out in KL Sentral once the operator of KLIA Express, ERL Berhad introduce the new facility.

Baggage is handled by two companies, Malaysia Airlines and Kuala Lumpur Airport Services (KLAS). The Malaysia Airlines System handles most airlines landing at KLIA whereas KLAS also handles the remaining airlines.

IATA had agreed to facilitate the usage of RFID tags between KL International Airport and Hong Kong Airport after the launch of the world's smallest multiband RFID chip in Kuala Lumpur. KLIA will be the second airport to use RFID

The RFID baggage tagging trial between Kuala Lumpur International Airport and Hong Kong International Airport is completed. Baggage tags are being issued at both Malaysia Airlines and Cathay Pacific check-in counters. The trial was delayed due to problems obtaining printers. Furthermore, KLIA is now awaiting reports from IATA which scheduled to be released first quarter of 2008.

Some of the facilities of the baggage handling system  include:
8 short-term car park baggage check-in counters 
8 bus and train stations baggage check-in counters 
3 stage baggage security screening system 
Early check-in baggage storage (1,200 bags capacity) 
17 baggage reclaim carousels together with LCCT
33 km total length of conveyor belts 
Part of the belts travel through a 1.1 km tunnel from the Main Terminal Building to the Satellite Building

Fire and rescue

Airport Fire and Rescue Services (AFRS) rated Category 10 are provided to cope with aircraft accidents. There are three fire stations at the airport.

Both fire stations are equipped with fire and emergency rescue equipment. There are total of 10 Ultra Large Foam Tender, Ziegler 8-(8x8) vehicles costing RM 3.8 million each.

Kuala Lumpur International Airport is the world's second airport to be equipped with explosive goods diffusion chamber, after Munich International Airport. Diffusion of highly explosive goods can be made safely in these two chambers which cost about RM 1.6 million each.

Air cargo
The center is designed as an integrated transshipment hub within a Free Commercial Zone. Fueled by high economic growth in the South East Asian countries and China, the airport handled 672,888 tonnes of air cargo in 2006, a 5.9% growth over the 2005 fiscal year.

Applying new information technologies, the main operator of the center, MASKargo introduced various artificial intelligence systems to handle cargo such as KLIA Community System (KLIACS) and e-Invoicing and Payment. It pioneered the DagangNET System, allowing users to conduct trade declarations and apply for permits over the internet and speeding the approval process by controlling authorities. These systems will be linked the Total Airport Management System.

In 2008, Kuala Lumpur International Airport was the 27th busiest airport by cargo traffic, based on Airports Council International statistics.

Animal hotel

The animal hotel is operated by Malaysia Airlines's cargo arm, MASKargo. The hotel manages all imports, exports and stop-over transhipments that are related to animals, and offers a pets stay-in program where owners can leave their pets to in the hotel while they are away for vacations.

Security 
The airport's security comes under the purview of the Polis Bantuan Malaysia Airports Berhad or Malaysia Airports Berhad Auxiliary Police. They are trained at Malaysia Airport Training Centre (MATC), Penang. Since the September 11, 2001 attacks, airport security has been increased with more stringent checks at security checkpoints, and upgrading to more sophisticated x-ray equipment and surveillance systems. The auxiliary policemen in KLIA wear the same blue uniform and insignia as their counterparts in PDRM, which is a common practice among the auxiliary police corp in Malaysia.  The only difference is that they wear a shoulder patch with the Malaysia Airports Berhad company logo with the wordings Polis Bantuan or Auxiliary Police embroidered under it. A security surcharge has been introduced to bear part of the cost.

Aircraft maintenance

There are four hangars housing facilities to provide aircraft maintenance provided by Malaysia Airlines and Kuala Lumpur Airport Service (KLAS). The airport also has a hangar which is purposely built for the Airbus A380, the first in South East Asia. The construction of the hangar was completed in 2007.

Meteorological services
The Aeronautical Meteorological Station (AMS) is located near Runway 14R-32L which provides weather information for the aviation community in compliance with International Civil Aviation Organization standards. AMS constantly make weather observations and issues aerodrome warnings on adverse weather for protection of aerodrome facilities and aircraft on the ground. The AMS houses a Meteorological Data Processing System (MDPS) for weather data collection, processing, storage and analytical needs.

Other buildings
Malaysia Airlines has its head office in the Southern Support Zone. The head office moved there in December 2015.

The Air Asia head office is located on the airport property.  AirAsia planned to move its head office to a new , RM140mil facility constructed at klia2. Until the new head office opened, the airline's head office remained at LCCT. The new klia2 head office was scheduled to open in the end of 2015. It is scheduled to hold about 2,000 AirAsia and AirAsia X employees. Aireen Omar, the AirAsia Country CEO of Malaysia, stated that the headquarters needed to be redesigned because in the klia2 plans the location of the control tower had been changed. Construction on the facility was scheduled to begin in July 2014. Malaysia Airports Holdings is leasing the land that will be occupied by the headquarters. Filipina AirAsia X flight attendant January Ann Baysa gave the building the name "RedQuarters" or "RedQ", and its groundbreaking ceremony was held in November 2014.

MASkargo has its head office at 1M, Zone C in the Advanced Cargo Centre in the KLIA Free Commercial Zone in the Southern Support Zone Malaysia Airports has its head office in the Malaysia Airports Corporate Office in the Persiaran Korporat KLIA. Malaysia Airlines operates its Flight Management Building at KLIA. It includes the head office of MAS Golden Boutiques Sdn. Bhd.

References

Kuala Lumpur International Airport